The Pakistan Nuclear Society (PNS) is an academic not-for-profit educational and scientific learned society devoted to the promotion of peaceful use of nuclear energy and the lobbying for commercial nuclear power development in the country.  The PNS has approximately more than 1000 life members (scientists, engineers, physicians, doctors and educators). PNS is a member of International Nuclear Societies Council (INSC) and PNS also closely interacted with its associated international nuclear societies and organizations.

The PNS was established in 1992 by a group of senior scientists and engineers. The PNS provides an understanding of the peaceful application of atomic nucleus, nuclear science, technology and allied disciplines while lobbying for the nuclear power development for economical use. Its first Chairman was Munir Ahmad Khan who succeeded in organizing the society and helped register the society under the societies registration Act 1860, Constitution of Pakistan. The PNS is governed by nine officers elected by the members for a two-year term and its secretariat is housed at Islamabad.

The PNS publishes The News (Newsletter of Pakistan Nuclear Society (PNS)), and its annual meeting took place in the month of September each year.  The PNS is governed through an executive council comprising the president, vice-president, general-secretary, finance-secretary and five executive members. The PNS interacts with following counterpart organizations:

Chinese Nuclear Society
American Nuclear Society
European Nuclear Society
Korean Nuclear Society
Canadian Nuclear Society
Nuclear Society of Thailand 
Hungarians Nuclear Society
Atomic Energy Society of Japan
Spanish Nuclear Society

See also
List of nuclear power groups
World Nuclear Association
World Nuclear University

References

External links
 PNS official website

Learned societies of Pakistan
Scientific organisations based in Pakistan
Professional associations based in Pakistan